North Knobs Township is one of twelve townships in Yadkin County, North Carolina, United States. The township had a population of 4,461 according to the 2000 census.

Geographically, North Knobs Township occupies  in northwestern Yadkin County.  North Knobs Township's northern border is the Yadkin River.  The only incorporated municipality within North Knobs Township is the Town of Jonesville.

Townships in Yadkin County, North Carolina
Townships in North Carolina